Revigny is a commune in the Jura department in the administrative region of Bourgogne-Franche-Comté in eastern France.

Geography
The Vallière has its source in the southern part of the commune; it flows north through the commune in the steephead valley.

Population

See also
Communes of the Jura department

References

Communes of Jura (department)